NBA Premium TV was a Philippine pay television sports-oriented network owned by Solar Entertainment Corporation. The channel is a joint venture between Solar and NBA TV. It was a live simulcast broadcast of NBA TV, the league's dedicated channel in the United States.

On September 25, 2019, it announced on the official Facebook page of Basketball TV (BTV) as well as on its Instagram and Twitter accounts that the channel and BTV will cease their operations on October 1, 2019. The final program to air on this channel was a replay of NBA Playoff Playback on September 30, 2019, before signing off at 12:10 a.m. on October 1, 2019.

Upon the channel's termination, Sky Cable and Cignal in their joint statement said that they were jointly negotiating directly with the NBA to make games and programming available to millions of fans in the Philippines, “We have submitted an offer to the NBA and are awaiting a response.” 10 months later, NBA awarded the broadcast rights of its games to Cignal and its sister stations TV5 and One Sports, with Cignal launching its own channel NBA TV Philippines on July 31, 2020.

Features

NBA Premium was the sister channel of Basketball TV (now defunct), but the channel aired more games and NBA-content than its sister channel or ABS-CBN (Free TV partner). Since it was also a re-direct broadcast of NBA TV, there were no local commercial insertions and only aired commercials coming from the US feed and during some NBA games were not to be televised on NBA TV, it used local advertisements and few from the US advertisements. The channel was only dedicated to NBA programs. The channel also retained commentary from US broadcast during the NBA Finals, and also a direct re-broadcast from ABC/ESPN, while BTV and ABS-CBN used the world feed and local commentary, respectively. The channel also aired NBA-related programming during off-season like WNBA games on pre-season games.

History
On April 10, 2017, Sky Cable, Destiny Cable & Sky Direct dropped NBA Premium TV along with Basketball TV, Jack TV, Solar Sports & CT (now defunct) allegedly due to Sky Cable's unpaid carriage fees. However, on October 16, 2018, the channel was restored on Sky Cable & Sky Direct after 18 months of carriage disputes. On October 28, 2018, the channel was dropped again on Sky Cable & Sky Direct. On January 1, 2019, the channel was restored again on Sky Cable and Sky Direct.

Final programming

Season
 NBA Regular Season/Post-season Games
 Pre-game and Post game shows
 Inside the NBA
 NBA Action
 Fantasy Insider
 The Beat
 The Jump
 NBA TV Marquee Match-up of the week
 NBA Gametime Live
 NBA All-Star Game
 NBA Mid-season Report Card
 NBA Special
 Playoff Playback

Off season
 NBA Greatest Games
 Hardwood Classics
 NBA Top Games of the Year
 NBA Courtside Cinema
 Old School Monday
 WNBA Regular Season/Play off Games
 WNBA Action
 Championship Clinchers
 Team USA exhibition games
 NBA Draft
 Summer League Games
 Training Camp

See also
 Basketball TV, NBA Premium TV's sister channel
 Solar Sports, NBA Premium TV's sister channel
 NBA TV Philippines, NBA Premium TV's replacement
 NBA League Pass, NBA's global streaming service

References

Television channels and stations established in 2010
Former Solar Entertainment Corporation channels
Basketball mass media
National Basketball Association on television
Sports television networks in the Philippines
English-language television stations in the Philippines
Men's interest channels
Defunct television networks in the Philippines
Television networks in the Philippines
2010 establishments in the Philippines
Television channels and stations disestablished in 2019
2019 disestablishments in the Philippines